Clear Lake is a census-designated place (CDP) in Pierce County, Washington, north of the town of Eatonville. The population was 1,419 as of the 2010 census.  The name comes from that of the lake of the same name located in the middle of the census-designated place.

Geography
Clear Lake is located at  (46.92844, -122.304963).

According to the United States Census Bureau, the CDP has a total area of 9.11 square miles (23.59 km2), of which, 8.48 square miles (21.97 km2) of it is land and 0.63 square miles (1.62 km2) of it (6.88%) is water.

Demographics

As of the census of 2010, there were 1,419 people, 522 households, and 391 families residing in the CDP. The population density was 155.8 people per square mile (60.2/km2). There were 659 housing units at an average density of 72.4/sq mi (27.9/km2). The racial makeup of the CDP was 92.2% White, 0.4% African American, 0.8% Native American, 0.8% Asian, 0.0% Pacific Islander, 1.7% from other races, and 4.0% from two or more races. Hispanic or Latino of any race were 3.2% of the population.

There were 522 households, out of which 33.7% had children under the age of 18 living with them, 63.8% were married couples living together, 6.3% had a female householder with no husband present, and 25.1% were non-families. 17.6% of all households were made up of individuals, and 6.9% had someone living alone who was 65 years of age or older. The average household size was 2.72 and the average family size was 3.06.

In the CDP, the age distribution of the population shows 23.0% under the age of 18, 7.8% from 18 to 24, 21.4% from 25 to 44, 35.2% from 45 to 64, and 12.6% who were 65 years of age or older. The median age was 43.9 years. For every 100 females, there were 108.4 males. For every 100 females age 18 and over, there were 109.6 males.

References

Census-designated places in Pierce County, Washington
Census-designated places in Washington (state)